The Dallara GP3/10 was a first generation car developed by Dallara to run as the sole chassis for the inaugural GP3 Series season in 2010 to its last in 2012 as a feeder series for the parent GP2 series where Dallara also designs the chassis. It debuted in May 2010 at Catalunya and had its final run in September 2012 in Monza.

History
During its run, it claimed championship titles for Esteban Gutiérrez in 2010, Valtteri Bottas in 2011 and finally Mitch Evans in 2012 with ART Grand Prix winning the teams title on all accounts. It also helped 9 drivers successfully graduate into the GP2 parent series. Both Gutiérrez and Bottas made their F1 debuts in the 2013 Formula 1 season with Sauber and Williams respectively.

Each team was allowed to run three separate GP3/10's, and with a total of ten different teams and thirty cars on the grid, it was one of the largest grids in motor-sport making it a rather unstable class of racing. With the chassis to be taken over by the GP3/13 in 2013, the number of cars on track was limited to twenty seven.

Gallery

References

GP3 Series
Open wheel racing cars
GP3/10
GP3 Series cars